Maurice may refer to:

People 
Saint Maurice (died 287), Roman legionary and Christian martyr
Maurice (emperor) or Flavius Mauricius Tiberius Augustus (539–602), Byzantine emperor
Maurice (bishop of London) (died 1107), Lord Chancellor and Lord Keeper of England
Maurice of Carnoet (1117–1191), Breton abbot and saint
Maurice, Count of Oldenburg (fl. 1169–1211)
Maurice of Inchaffray (14th century), Scottish cleric who became a bishop
Maurice, Elector of Saxony (1521–1553), German Saxon nobleman
Maurice, Duke of Saxe-Lauenburg (1551–1612)
Maurice of Nassau, Prince of Orange (1567–1625), stadtholder of the Netherlands
Maurice, Landgrave of Hesse-Kassel or Maurice the Learned (1572–1632)
Maurice of Savoy (1593–1657), prince of Savoy and a cardinal
Maurice, Duke of Saxe-Zeitz (1619–1681)
Maurice of the Palatinate (1620–1652), Count Palatine of the Rhine
Maurice of the Netherlands (1843–1850), prince of Orange-Nassau
Maurice Chevalier (1888–1972), French actor, singer, and entertainer
Maurice of Battenberg (1891–1914), prince of the Battenberg family and member of the British royal family
Maurice the Hormone Monster, a main character in the adult animated television series Big Mouth
Maurice Joshua, American record producer who released several recordings under the mononym Maurice
Sir Maurice Banks (1901–1991), British businessman

Places
  or Mauritius
Maurice, Iowa, a city
Maurice, Louisiana, a village
Maurice River, a tributary of the Delaware River in New Jersey

Other uses
Maurice (name), a given name and surname, including a list of people with the name
Maurice (horse), a Thoroughbred racehorse
Maurice (novel), a 1913 novel by E. M. Forster and published in 1971
Maurice (film), a 1987 British film based on the novel
Maurice (Shelley), a children's story by Mary Shelley
Maurices, an American retail clothing chain

See also
Church of Saint Maurice (disambiguation)
Maurice Debate, a 1918 debate in the British House of Commons
Maurice Lacroix, Swiss manufacturer of mechanical timepieces, clocks, and watches
Moritz (disambiguation)
Morrice, a surname
Morris (disambiguation)
Saint-Maurice (disambiguation)

ja:モーリス